Basdeo Panday (born 25 May 1933) is a Trinidadian and Tobagonian lawyer, politician, trade unionist, economist, actor, and former civil servant who served as the fifth Prime Minister of Trinidad and Tobago from 1995 to 2001. He was the first person of Indian descent along with being the first Hindu to hold the office of Prime Minister of Trinidad and Tobago. He was first elected to Parliament in 1976 as the Member for Couva North, Panday served as Leader of the Opposition five times between 1976 and 2010 and was a founding member of the United Labour Front (ULF), the National Alliance for Reconstruction (NAR), and the United National Congress (UNC). He served as leader of the ULF and UNC, and was President General of the All Trinidad Sugar and General Workers' Trade Union.

He is the former chairman and party leader of the United National Congress. In 2006, Panday was convicted of failing to declare a bank account in London and imprisoned; however, on March 20, 2007, that conviction was quashed by the Court of Appeal. On May 1 he decided to resign as Chairman of the United National Congress, but the party's executive refused to accept his resignation. He lost the party's internal elections on January 24, 2010, to Deputy Leader and now former Prime Minister Kamla Persad-Bissessar.

In 2005, he was awarded the Pravasi Bharatiya Samman by the Ministry of Overseas Indian Affairs.

Early life
Basdeo Panday was born on 25 May 1933, in St. Julien Village, Princes Town, British Trinidad and Tobago into a Hindu Indo-Trinidadian family to Kissoondaye and Harry "Chote" Sookchand Panday. His grandparents were from British India and came under the Indian indenture system. One of his grandmothers was from Laxmanpur, a farming village of the Azamgarh district in the Bhojpur region of the present-day state of Uttar Pradesh in the Hindi Belt of North India. He attended New Grant Government School and
St. Julien Presbyterian School. He was later enrolled in Presentation College, San Fernando. He later worked as a sugarcane weigher at the Williamsville Estate near Princes Town for one crop season in 1951. He then worked as a primary school teacher at Seereram Memorial Vedic School in Montrose, Chaguanas, and at St. Clement Vedic School at the St. Clement Junction in St. Madeleine. He was also a civil servant at the San Fernando Magistrate's Court where he took notes for Magistrate Churchill Johnson, Magistrate Errol Roopnarine, and Magistrate Noor Mohamed Hassanali, who would go on to be the President of Trinidad and Tobago during Panday's term as prime minister.

In 1957, Panday left Trinidad and Tobago to go to the United Kingdom to further his education. He obtained a diploma in drama from London School of Dramatic Art in 1960 and a degree in law in 1962 from Inns of Court School of Law where he was a member of Lincoln's Inn and was subsequently called to the bar. He also received a Bachelor of Science in economics from the University of London as an external student in 1965. While in the United Kingdom, Panday worked as a laborer on a building site, a clerk at the London County Council, and an electrician to support himself through university. He also appeared in several acting roles, including Nine Hours to Rama (1963) and The Winston Affair (1964). In 1965, he was awarded  a Commonwealth scholarship to go to  the Delhi School of Economics in India to pursue a post-graduate degree in economics and political science; however, he turned down the offer and returned to Trinidad and Tobago in 1965 to practice law because of family commitments and the changing political situation in the newly independent Trinidad and Tobago.

Political career

Early years 
Panday's political career began in 1965, when he joined the Workers and Farmers Party and made an unsuccessful run for Parliament. In 1972, he was appointed as an opposition senator for the Democratic Labour Party. The following year he was recruited to the All Trinidad Sugar Estates and Factory Workers Union. He staged an internal coup, becoming the union's President General and under him the union expanded to workers from a variety of industries and became the All Trinidad Sugar and General Workers' Trade Union.

On 8 February 1975, amidst the backdrop of labour struggles, Panday met with fellow union leaders George Weekes and Raffique Shah. Together, they founded the United Labour Front. All three were arrested on March 18 during an attempted march from San Fernando to Port-of-Spain, but were found not guilty on April 22 "on the charge of leading a public march without permission".

Panday won the Couva North seat in the 1976 general election, becoming an MP and official opposition leader. The next year the party split into two factions and Panday was ousted as party leader in favour of Shah. He was reinstated in 1978 after Winston Nanan, who previously supported Shah, defected to Panday and Shah resigned.

Following a poor performance in the 1980 local elections, Panday co-founded the Trinidad and Tobago National Alliance with A. N. R. Robinson of the Democratic Action Congress and Lloyd Best of the Tapia House Group. He retained his seat in the 1981 general election.

In 1984 the National Alliance became the National Alliance for Reconstruction (NAR) and in 1985 merged with the Organisation for National Reconstruction. They won a decisive victory in 1986. Panday was named Minister of External Affairs and International Trade.  The party soon fractured along racial lines; Panday accused Robinson and the government of discrimination against Indians and autocratic rule. Robinson reshuffled his cabinet in response, and Panday found himself with reduced ministerial responsibilities. The infighting continued, culminating with Panday, Kelvin Ramnath, and Trevor Sudama being expelled from the party on February 8, 1988.

UNC, Prime Ministership, and electoral crises 
Panday and the other expelled ministers founded the Caucus for Love, Unity and Brotherhood (CLUB '88), which he revealed in October would become the United National Congress (UNC) on 30 April 1989. Economic decline, austerity, racial tensions and, above all, the failed but impactful 1990 coup attempt led to the NAR being swept out of power in the 1991 general election and the UNC, led by Panday, becoming official opposition.

The 1995 general election was a defining moment in Panday's career. The ruling PNM party called an early vote, expecting a victory. However, the election ended with the PNM and UNC holding 17 seats each, and the NAR holding 2. The UNC and NAR entered a coalition, thereby bringing the UNC into power and making Panday the first Indo-Trinidadian Prime Minister of Trinidad and Tobago. In 1995 Panday was charged with five counts of sexual indecency related to a harassment case brought by a former female supporter, however he was freed less than two after the 1995 election.

Panday once again led the UNC to victory in the 2000 election, being sworn in as Prime Minister for a second time. In 2001, UNC MPs Ramesh Maharaj, Trevor Sudama, and Ralph Maraj alleged government corruption, pressuring Panday to appoint a Commission of Inquiry; Panday responded by firing Maharaj. Sudama and Maraj then resigned, leaving the UNC with a minority. Panday was thus forced to call a new election. The 2001 general election resulted in an unprecedented 18–18 tie between the UNC and PNM, sparking a constitutional crisis over who should form government. Both parties agreed to abide by the decision of the president, A.N.R. Robinson, as to who would lead the government, as well as to form a unity government. However, Panday reneged on the agreement when Robinson appointed PNM leader Patrick Manning, finding his explanation for doing so (Manning's "moral and spiritual values") unsatisfactory. Panday also argued that Robinson did not act in accordance with the constitution by choosing Manning, as he did not hold the majority in parliament. He refused to accept the position of Leader of the Opposition in protest.

Parliament was dissolved and new elections were called in 2002 after it was unable to elect a Speaker. This time the PNM were brought back into power with the UNC playing opposition. Panday's third term as Leader of the Opposition would last until 2006, when he was convicted of failing to declare a bank account in London.

Secret investigations into Panday began after the 2001 election, when the Central Authority and the Anti Corruption Bureau was set up by the PNM. On 18 September 2002, Panday was charged under section 27(1)(b) of the Integrity in Public Life Act No. 8 of 1987 for failing to declare the contents of a bank account in London for the years 1997, 1998 and 1999. During the investigation, he had first stated that the funds in the account were for his children's education and that his name was added to the account to prevent problems should something happen to his wife. He did not consider the funds his own, and thus did not declare them. However, after receiving further information from the bank, he stated that the account had been opened jointly with his wife to deposit money for his open heart surgery. After his wife transferred the account to another branch she maintained and administered it, and his name remained on it out of convenience. Panday blamed it on the PNM for trying to derail him weeks before the 2002 general election was to be held.

UNC leadership and power struggles

On 31 May 2005, Panday, his wife, Oma, former UNC MP Carlos John, and businessman Ishwar Galbaransingh (chairman of Northern Construction Limited) were arrested on corruption charges. The State alleged that the Pandays had received TT$250,000 on December 30, 1998, from John and Galbaransingh in exchange for giving Northern Construction a construction contract for the Piarco Airport Development Project (PADP). Panday, Oma Panday and John were placed on TT$750,000 bail, while Galbaransingh's bail was placed at TT$1,000,000. Panday refused bail and chose to remain in prison. This was called a punitive bail both by supporters of the UNC and by former Attorney General Ramesh Maharaj, a sometimes political opponent of Panday. On June 7, 2005, bail was reduced to TT$650,000. A day later, Panday accepted bail after being jailed for over a week. Charges were later dropped in 2012.

In September 2005, during the UNC internal elections, Panday nominated Winston Dookeran as his successor as party leader. He himself retained the position of chairman.  The following month, Jack Warner called for Panday to hand over the position of Leader of the Opposition to Dookeran as well. Panday failed to do so, and with the Opposition MPs split 8–8 on the issue, Panday remained as the leader of the Opposition .

In October, Panday also invited Ramesh Maharaj back into the UNC.  In February 2006, Panday fired senator Robin Montano, who opposed Maharaj's return to the party. Three days later senator Roy Augustus resigned. He replaced Montano with Tim Gopeesingh, and Augustus with former Olympic athlete Ato Boldon.

On 24 April 2006, Panday was found guilty on all three counts he was charged with back in 2002, and sentenced to two years with hard labour and a TT$20,000 fine. He was also denied bail, and ordered to pay the sum in the account "for each year he was charged for not making the declaration". He appealed the decision. Following his 2006 conviction, Panday's position as Leader of the Opposition was revoked. He was replaced by Kamla Persad-Bissessar.

On 3 January 2007, Panday was reinstated as leader of the UNC. On 20 March 2007, the Court of Appeal overturned the conviction against Panday, based on the possibility that he may not have received a fair trial. A new trial under a different magistrate was ordered. The three Court of Appeal judges agreed that there was, in fact, a real possibility of bias by the Chief Magistrate in his ruling. Information that surfaced later on, linked Chief Magistrate McNicolls to a multimillion-dollar land deal and a company associated with one of the main witnesses in the Basdeo Panday trial. This information, along with the fact that Chief Magistrate McNicolls refused to give evidence for the criminal prosecution of the Chief Justice Satnarine Sharma, who he claimed tried to influence him to rule in Panday's favor, which caused that prosecution to fail, were the main arguments used by Panday's lawyers in his Appeal Court hearing.

Since early 2009 Basdeo Panday was challenged for the leadership of the party by a small coalition of Opposition MPs led by the party's deputy political leader, Warner and Maharaj.

Political hiatus and acquittal
On January 24, 2010, Panday lost his bid to be elected Political Leader of the UNC once again. He suffered a defeat at the hands of new Political Leader Kamla Persad-Bissessar. He did not contest the post of chairman hence he no longer sits on the executive of the United National Congress. On 25 February 2010 President George Maxwell Richards revoked the appointment of Panday as Leader of the Opposition and replaced him with Persad-Bissessar after the majority of Opposition MPs indicated their support for her. Panday did not participate in the general elections held on 24 May 2010 and hence his term as a Member of Parliament ended.

On 26 June 2012, Panday was finally acquitted of all charges. The magistrate stated that he had not been given due process. However, in September 2012, the Director of Public Prosecutions (DPP) was given leave to challenge the decision. On 7 October 2014, the DPP withdrew the application to review the decision. The presiding Justice stated that Panday would've "face hardships and prejudice" if prosecution continued, which it did not. Also in 2012, charges for the Piarco Airport scandal were dropped.

Patriotic Front and return to politics
On the 25 May 2019 (Panday's birthday), Panday's daughter Mickela, after leaving the UNC, formed a new political party called the Patriotic Front. Panday, being estranged from the UNC, became associated with the Patriotic Front and in 2020, a year after, on his birthday and first anniversary of the party, he said he would support his daughter's party in the 2020 Trinidad and Tobago general election and he even expressed interest in returning to politics given the situation of the country and said that he could no not sit by idly and watch the country continue on its current path. In June 2020 Mickela Panday announced that her father was the campaign manager of the Patriotic Front. The party however pulled out of the 2020 general elections, saying that they had no time to mobilize themselves.

Impact on Trinidadian and Tobagonian culture and media

Impact of election 
The election of the first Indo-Trinidadian prime minister was seen as the moment in which Indians "arrived" in Trinidad. Panday took the opportunity to correct perceived wrongs against the Indo-Trinidadian and Tobagonian community.

Religion and Holidays 
Shortly after beginning his first term as Prime Minister, Panday granted the Shouter Baptists a national holiday. His political sponsorship contributed to the legitimization of the religion in the public's eye.  He also decreed that Indian Arrival Day would forever be named as such, rather than simply "Arrival Day" after 1996. He was well known for his religious pluralism and often quoted from the scriptures of the different religions in Trinidad and Tobago.

Music
Panday was the subject of several critical and racist calypsos during his first year office, such has Cro Cro's Allyuh Look for Dat and Watchman's Mr. Panday Needs His Glasses. Panday struck back in 1997 by warning of guidelines for state-sponsored competitions to prevent "taxpayers money [being] used to divide the society, whether it be on racial or any other grounds"

Language 
In addition to speaking English, Panday studied Hindi and he has given speeches at the Hindi FoundationTT on the importance of the language in Trinidad and Tobago. Panday is widely associated with the Trinidadian Hindustani word neemakharam (ingrate), and has popularized the term outside of the Indo-Trinidadian community. He has used the word to describe his political opponents, including Winston Dookeran, Trevor Sudama, Kamla Persad-Bissessar, Ramesh Maharaj, and other rival UNC members.

Relationship with the press 
Panday feuded with the media several times during his political career. In 1996 the Trinidad Guardian ran a front page featuring a photo of him with a drink and the headline "Chutney Rising". An incensed Panday ordered a boycott of the paper, refusing to allow their reporters access to government information. He accused editor-in-chief Jones P. Madiera of being a racist and called on his resignation. Ultimately, managing editor Alwin Chow, Madiera, and several other staff members left the Guardian and went on to form a new newspaper, The Independent.

Panday reiterated his dissatisfaction with the press with his refusal to sign the Declaration of Chapultepec, a 1994 document affirming freedom of the press. In 1998 he stated he would not endorse the declaration "until it repudiated the “untrammelled right of the press to publish anything it wants”".

Personal life
Basdeo Panday is married to Oma Panday (née Ramkissoon). He has four daughters: Niala, Mickela, Nicola, and Vastala. Niala was born to his first wife Norma Panday (née Mohammed), who died in 1981. Panday serves as the Chief Administrator of the Basdeo Panday Foundation, a charitable organization. In November of 2019, Panday was bestowed an honorary Doctor of Laws degree from the University of Trinidad and Tobago. His religion is Hinduism. His brother-in-law was the late Indian classical- and chutney-singer Sam Boodram who was married to Panday's sister Cynthia Panday. Panday has a dog named Norman who was a stray that he took in. During the COVID-19 pandemic videos that Panday's daughter, Mickela, posted of him gardening and playing with his dog Norman went viral on social media and he was lauded by the news as setting an example by following the mandate to stay home to help combat the spread of the virus.

Filmography and stage credits

See also
 List of prime ministers of Trinidad and Tobago
 Indo-Trinidadian and Tobagonian
 Hinduism in Trinidad and Tobago
 Indo-Caribbean
 British Indo-Caribbean people
 Hinduism in the West Indies
 Pravasi Bharatiya Samman
 Pravasi Bharatiya Divas
Indian Arrival Day
 Trinidadian and Tobagonian British
 Trinidadians
 List of Trinidadians
List of Indo-Trinidadians and Tobagonians
 Indian

References

External links
 NALIS Biography of Basdeo Panday

1933 births
Living people
Trinidad and Tobago people of Indian descent
Alumni of University of London Worldwide
Alumni of the University of London
Prime Ministers of Trinidad and Tobago
Foreign ministers of Trinidad and Tobago
Members of the House of Representatives (Trinidad and Tobago)
United National Congress politicians
United Labour Front politicians
Workers and Farmers Party politicians
Trinidad and Tobago politicians of Indian descent
Trinidad and Tobago trade unionists
20th-century Trinidad and Tobago lawyers
Trinidad and Tobago Hindus
People from Princes Town region
Heads of government who were later imprisoned
Anti-capitalists
North American democratic socialists
Trinidad and Tobago communists
Trinidad and Tobago socialists
Recipients of Pravasi Bharatiya Samman